is a Japanese light novel authored by Mitsuru Yūki and illustrated by Sakura Asagi. The novel is serialized in Kadokawa Shoten's The Beans. The light novel has 47 volumes, including three short stories and a side story. A manga acting as a gaiden is being serialized in Beans Ace.

There is also a series of drama CDs, a PlayStation 2 game and a manga adaptation that was announced in 2005 and a musical as well. Moreover, it was announced in August 2006 in Newtype that the anime adaptation would be animated by Studio Deen and the character design was to be done by Shinobu Tagashira. It began its broadcast on October 3, 2006.

The anime premiered on Animax under the title, Shōnen Onmyoji: The Young Spirit Master. It was aired across its respective networks worldwide, including Hong Kong, Taiwan and Vietnam, with translations and dubbed versions for English language networks in Southeast Asia, South Asia, and other regions.

The anime was licensed for North American distribution by Geneon Entertainment. However, only three volumes of the series have been released, and have yet to receive a full release due to Geneon's departure from the American market. On July 3, 2008, Funimation announced that it had struck a deal with Geneon to distribute and release several of their licenses, including Shōnen Onmyōji.

Story

The protagonist of the series, which is set in the Heian era, is Abe no Masahiro, the grandson of the great onmyōji, Abe no Seimei, who passed his teachings on to his grandson. Unfortunately, Masahiro has lost his sixth sense and with it the ability to see spirits. Masahiro constantly feels overshadowed by his grandfather's fame.

One day, Masahiro meets a fox-like creature which he names  who shows him his true potential powers after fighting a demon. Mokkun is actually , see Teng (mythology), who prefers to be called Guren.

Masahiro's dream to surpass his grandfather will not be realised as easily as he hopes. Not only does he have to convince the other Shinshō that he is Seimei's true successor, he must also increase his power in order to stop demons coming from China, the other parts of Japan and the Underworld. In addition to this he has to deal with the schemes of rival onmyōji who want to destroy Japan not to mention keeping his promise to protect Princess Akiko of the Fujiwara clan.

Story arcs
In the novels, there’re already 9 story arcs. However, the anime only covered two arcs, the Kyūki and Kazane arc.

Kyūki arc
The  starts from episode 1 to 12 in the anime and volume 1 to 3 in the novel. Kyūki, a winged tiger from the West or to be precise, China has been forced to evacuate after being defeated by another demon.

He arrives in Japan and plans to eat Fujiwara no Akiko to replenish his spirit powers and heal his wounds. With him are an army of foreign demons, all unknown to the inexperienced and apprentice onmyōji Masahiro who has started to use his skills.

Kazane arc
The  starts from episode 13 to 26 in the anime and volume 4 to 8 in the novel.

A vengeful spirit has been summoned and has cursed Yukinari of the Fujiwara clan. A mysterious woman appears and tries to take Seimei's life.

Someone is trying to open the gate to the underworld, events from fifty-five years ago reoccur, and Guren as well as Masahiro must undergo the ultimate test.

Episode list

See also
Abe no Seimei
Onmyōji
Shikigami

References
Specific

General

 Igeta, Haruyo et al. "Shonen Onmyoji". Newtype USA 5 (11) 62–63. November 2006. .

External links
Official Shōnen Onmyōji anime website 
Official FUNimation Shōnen Onmyōji anime website

2001 Japanese novels
2005 manga
2007 Japanese television series endings
Coming-of-age anime and manga
Exorcism in anime and manga
Geneon USA
Television shows based on light novels
Shōjo manga
Studio Deen
Light novels
Kadokawa Beans Bunko
Kadokawa Shoten manga
Kadokawa Dwango franchises
Supernatural anime and manga
Yōkai in anime and manga